A bioregion is an ecologically and geographically defined area that is smaller than a biogeographic realm, but larger than an ecoregion or an ecosystem, in the World Wide Fund for Nature classification scheme. There is also an attempt to use the term in a rank-less generalist sense, similar to the terms "biogeographic area" or "biogeographic unit".

It may be conceptually similar to an ecoprovince.

It is also differently used in the environmentalist context, being coined by Berg and Dasmann (1977).

WWF bioregions

The World Wide Fund for Nature (WWF) scheme divides some of the biogeographic realms into bioregions, defined as "geographic clusters of ecoregions that may span several habitat types, but have strong biogeographic affinities, particularly at taxonomic levels higher than the species level (genus, family)." The WWF bioregions are as follows:

Afrotropical realm
Western Africa and Sahel
Central Africa
Eastern and Southern Africa
Horn of Africa
Madagascar–Indian Ocean
Antarctic realm
Australasian realm
Australia
New Guinea and Melanesia
New Zealand
Wallacea
Indomalayan realm
Indian subcontinent
Indochina
Sunda Shelf and Philippine Archipelago
Nearctic realm
Canadian Shield
Eastern North America
Northern Mexico and Southwestern United States
Western North America
Neotropical realm
Amazonia
Caribbean
Central America
Central Andes
Eastern South America
Everglades
Northern Andes
Orinoco
Southern South America
Oceanian realm
Micronesia
Polynesia
Palearctic realm
Asia
East Asia north of the Himalayan system's foothills to the Arctic
Himalayan
Tibetan Plateau steppe
Yunnan–Guizhou Plateau
Northeast Asia
Russian Far East
Central Asia – Iranian Plateau and north to the Arctic.
Temperate Asia biocountry
Mongolian Plateau
Eurasian Steppe
Asian Russia (central)
Asian-Siberian region
Western Asia 
Arabian Desert
Mediterranean Near East (roughly corresponds to the Levant)
Anatolian Plateau
Transcaucasia 
Northern Africa
Atlantic coastal desert
Sahara Desert
Mediterranean Maghreb
Atlas montane
Europe
European Mediterranean Basin
Iberian Peninsula
Balkan Peninsula
North Caucasus
Alps montane
Carpathians
Scandinavia
European Russia
Euro-Siberian region
Macaronesia

See also
 
 Ecological classification
 
 Interim Biogeographic Regionalisation for Australia (IBRA)

References

Biogeography
Ecology terminology
Ecoregions
Biogeographic realms